= Ernst Melaun =

Austrian metal worker

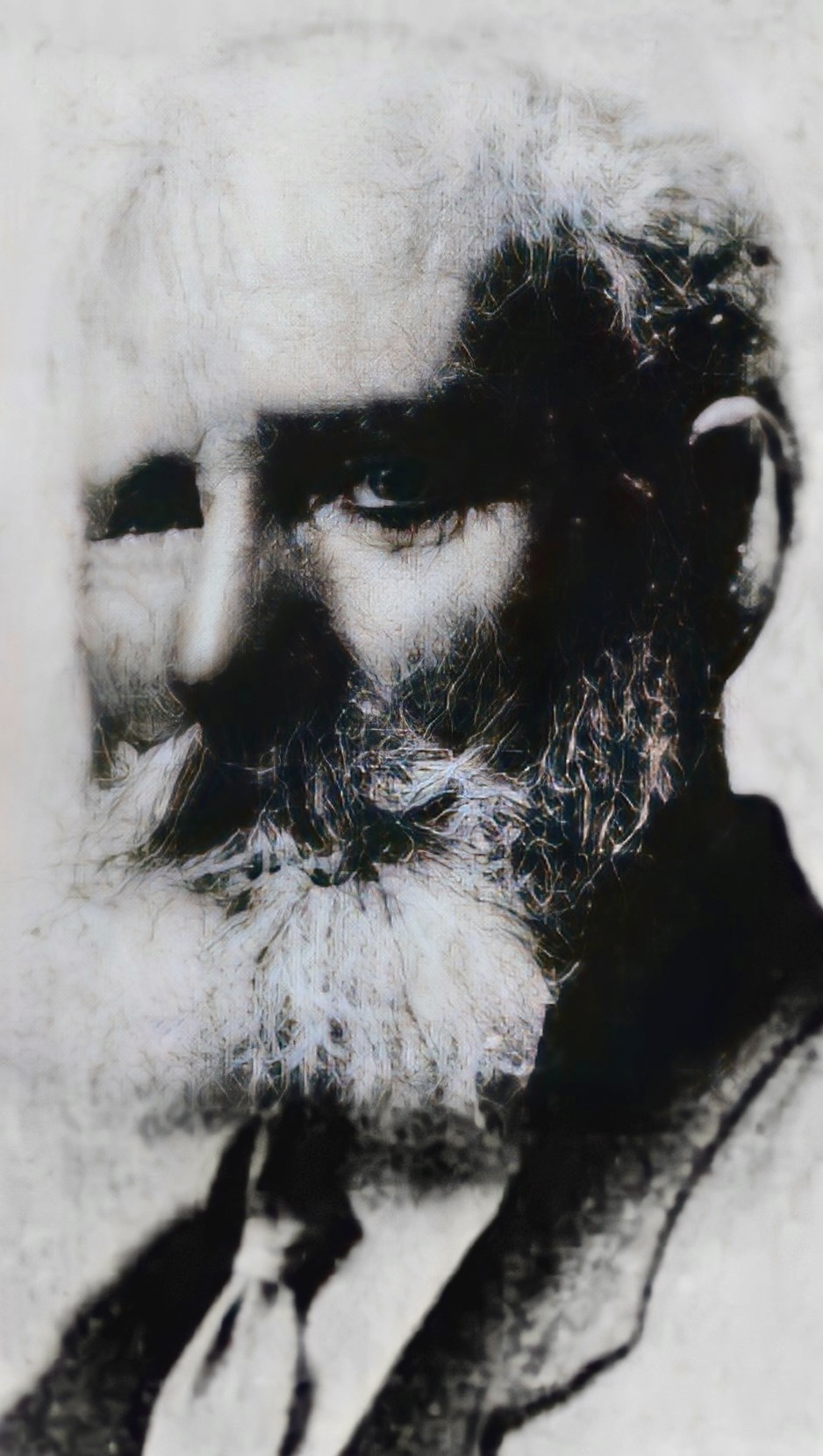
- Iron craftsman Ernst Melaun
- Born: February 2, 1856; Friedek Silesia, Austria
- Died: August 26, 1935 (aged 79); Indianapolis, Indiana US
- Resting place: Calvary Cemetery 435 West Troy Avenue Indianapolis, Marion County, Indiana, 46217 USA
- Education: craft school in Vienna Austria
- Known for: Ornamental wrought iron
- Spouse: Martha (née) Nedtwig Melaun
- Children: 3

Ernst Melaun (2 February 1856 - 26 August 1935) was an artist and master metal worker from Austria. He was known for designing and making decorative Ornamental iron pieces.

== Early life ==
Melaun was born 2 February 1856 in Friedek Silesia, Austria. He attended high school in Moravia. He then moved to Vienna Austria to attend a craft school where he had lessons in free hand drawing. He became a journeyman and traveled throughout Northern and Southern Germany learning about iron. Melaun was conscripted into the military for a five year period. He married Martha (née) Nedtwig Melaun. In 1882, he moved to America and settled in Chicago, where he lived for 7 years before moving to Milwaukee in 1889.

== Career ==
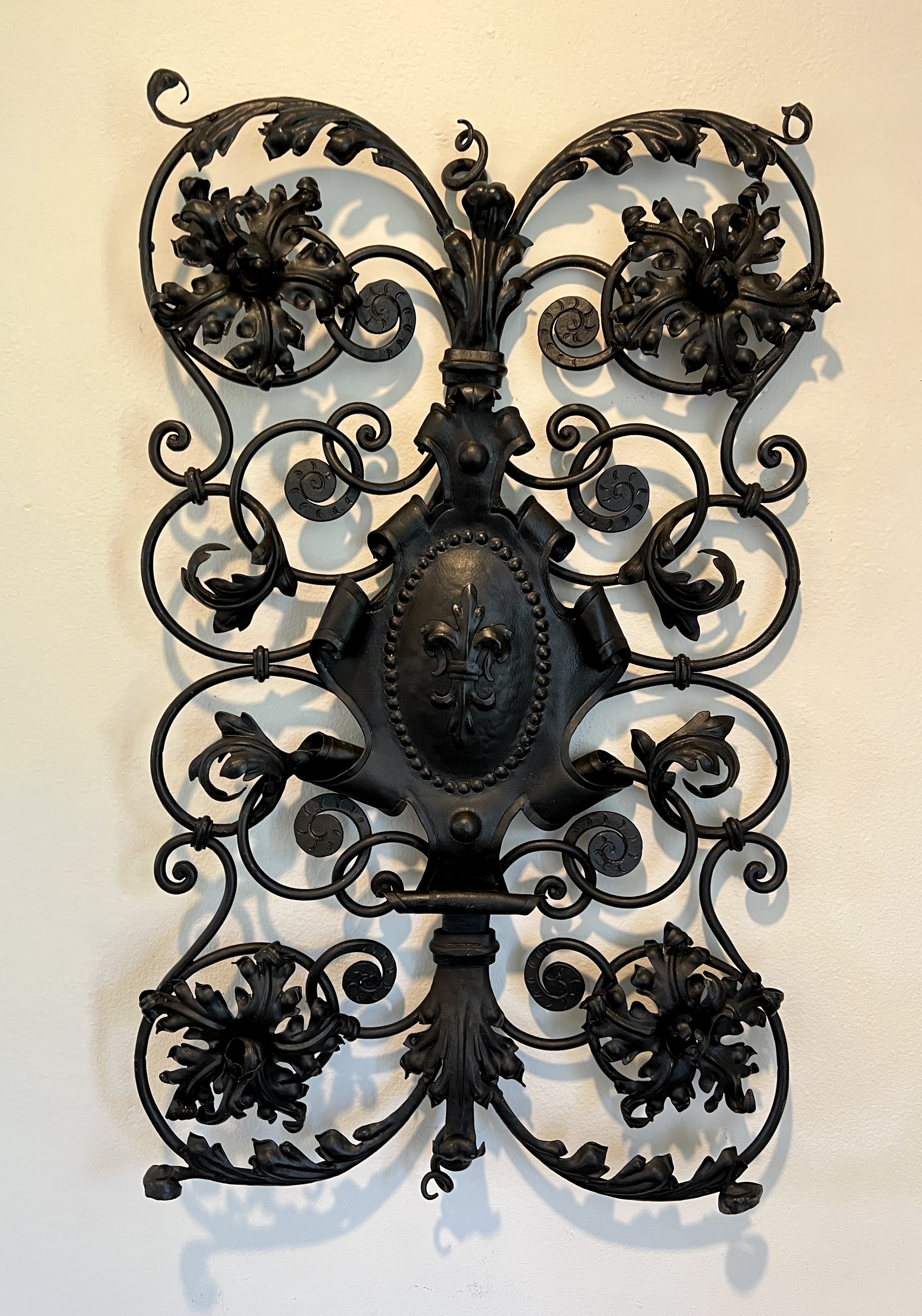
Ornamental wrought iron window grille by Ernst Melaun

In 1902, he moved from Milwaukee and settled in Indianapolis; there he became well known for his iron work. Toward the end of World War I his reputation for iron work reached other parts of America. He began to get orders and he working to fill orders from New York City, St. Louis, Chicago, Washington D.C. and Dallas, Texas. He worked in his shop with his two sons, Eric and Herman, and his daughter Gretchen handled office duties for the business. Throughout Indianapolis, he worked on large office building and cathedrals. Melaun was known for his ornamental designs. He was one of the few craftsmen producing iron pieces which were interior decorations.
